Yeomanry Housemay refer to:
Yeomanry House, Bloomsbury, a drill hall in Bloomsbury, London
Yeomanry House, Buckingham, a drill hall in Buckingham
Yeomanry House, Cupar, a drill hall in Cupar, Fife
Yeomanry House, Hertford, a drill hall in Hertford
Yeomanry House, Reading, a drill hall in Reading, Berkshire